Ružica Sokić (14 December 1934 – 19 December 2013) was a Serbian actress and writer.

Born in Belgrade, then Kingdom of Yugoslavia, Sokić began her acting career in 1957 and was credited in over 40 films and television shows. Her last acting credit was in 2011. In October 2010, she published the book The passion for flying.

Ružica Sokić was diagnosed with Alzheimer's disease and died from the illness on 19 December 2013, aged 79, in her hometown of Belgrade, Serbia.

Selected filmography

Subotom uvece (1957) - Navijacica (segment "Doktor") (uncredited)
Zvizduk u osam (1962) - Sekretarica u TV ekipi (uncredited)
Zemljaci (1963) - Cvijeta
March on the Drina (1964) - Zena na prozoru
Gorki deo reke (1965) - Jelena
Vreme ljubavi (1966) - (segment "Put")
Sticenik (1966) - Bozica (voice, uncredited)
Bokseri idu u raj (1967) - Svastika
Dim (1967)
Love Affair, or the Case of the Missing Switchboard Operator (1967) - Ruza, Izabelina koleginica
Kad budem mrtav i beo (1967) - Duska ... pevacica
Ima ljubavi, nema ljubavi (1968)
Sedmina (1969) - Ana
Cross Country (1969) - Sestra
Ljubav i poneka psovka (1969) - Elma
Traces of a Black Haired Girl (1972) - Kaca
Zuta (1973) - Zuta
Guns of War (1974) - Mira
Hitler iz naseg sokaka (1975) - Anika
Poznajete li Pavla Plesa? (1975) - Milena
Cuvar plaze u zimskom periodu (1976) - Udovica
Hajducka vremena (1977) - Brankova uciteljica
Leptirov oblak (1977) - Jela
Nije nego (1978) - Profesorka geografije
Pakleni otok (1979)
Avanture Borivoja Surdilovica (1980) - Andjelija
Savamala (1982) - Koletova majka
Tesna koza (1982) - Persida Pantic
Ja sam tvoj Bog (1983)
Vojnici (1984) - Gradjanka
Ada (1985) - Doktorica Sefer
Dancing in Water (1985) - Kica's mother
Druga Zikina dinastija (1986) - Vlajkova snajka Ruza
Majstor i Sampita (1986) - Bertina drugarica I
Oktoberfest (1987) - Luletova majka
Tesna koza 2 (1987) - Persida Pantic
Vec vidjeno (1987) - Glumica
Sta radis veceras (1988) - Milja (segment "Kravata obavezna")
Tesna koza 3 (1988) - Persida Pantic
Jednog lepog dana (1988) - Ana
Seobe (1989)
Tesna koza 4 (1991) - Persida Pantic
Original falsifikata (1991) - Mileva
Bracna putovanja (1991) - Johanova zena
Tango argentino (1992) - Rodjaka
Pun mesec nad Beogradom (1993) - Kosara
Tamna je noc (1995) - Ruzica Belezada
Proputovanje (1999) - Komsinica Vera (segment "Srebrni metak")
Normalni ljudi (2001) - Nikolina ujna
Sve je za ljude (2001) - Sudija
Zona Zamfirova (2001) - Taska
Zvezde ljubavi (2005) - Glumica
Otvoreni kavez (2015) - Ruza (final film role)

References

External links

1934 births
2013 deaths
Actresses from Belgrade
Serbian television actresses
Serbian film actresses
Serbian stage actresses
Serbian voice actresses
Deaths from Alzheimer's disease
Deaths from dementia in Serbia
University of Arts in Belgrade alumni
Writers from Belgrade
20th-century Serbian women writers
21st-century Serbian women writers
20th-century Serbian actresses
21st-century Serbian actresses
Golden Arena winners
Laureates of the Ring of Dobrica
Žanka Stokić award winners